Launch Complex 3  may refer to:

 Cape Canaveral Air Force Station Launch Complex 3, a deactivated US Air Force launch site
 Vandenberg AFB Space Launch Complex 3, a NASA launch site that has been used by a variety of rocket systems
 Xichang Launch Complex 3, an active rocket launch site in the People's Republic of China

See also

 Launch Complex (disambiguation)
 
 LC3 (disambiguation)